Mardi Gras Hangover is a fire ball attraction located at Six Flags Great America in Gurnee, Illinois, United States. Located in the Mardi Gras section, the attraction is themed on the Mardi Gras celebration.

Billed by Six Flags Great America as a "loop roller coaster” and the park's sixteenth coaster, the name was called inaccurate by experts and critics as the ride lacked reliance on the force of gravity, relying more on motorized wheels.

History

Background 

Six Flags Great America opened their Mardi Gras section in May 2004, replacing part of the Orleans Place themed section. One of the first original attractions for the new themed section was King Chaos, which was manufactured by HUSS as a top spin attraction. King Chaos sat on a plot of land formerly occupied by The Edge in the 1980s and Power Dive in 1990s. Thirteen years after the original opening of King Chaos, the park announced that the attraction would close on August 27, 2017. In a statement by the park, the ride was planned to be removed to "make room for new thrills." The replacement for King Chaos planned for the 2018 season was teased to be announced on August 31, 2017, with the teasing phrase being "Chase The Storm."

Announcement and opening 
On August 31, 2017, Six Flags Great America officially announced an unnamed attraction. Billed as the world's largest "loop coaster," the ride would be , and was called the sixteenth roller coaster by the park. The attraction was rumored to be named "Hurricane Force", but due to the effects of Hurricane Harvey, this was speculated to been withheld. Details for the unnamed attraction were revealed, which was described as having "face-off" seating, which riders were seated face-to-face with each other going around in a ring structure. The name "loop coaster" would be called inaccurate and misleading by experts and critics, citing lack of reliance on the force of gravity to coast on ride track while also stating that the ride is also controlled by motorized wheels that drive trains back and forth.

The official name for the attraction was announced on Valentine's Day, February 14, 2018, as Mardi Gras Hangover. Along with the ride, a Mardi Gras event called the "Mardi Gras Festival" was also announced to run during the summer. When the park opened for the 2018 season, the attraction did not open immediately. On Memorial Day weekend on May 22, 2018, the attraction officially opened to the public.

Characteristics

Theme 
Mardi Gras Hangover is themed to the Mardi Gras celebration.

Ride experience 

See also 
 Fire Ball

References

External links 

 Official website

Six Flags Great America
2018 establishments in Illinois
Six Flags attractions